Podgórze  is a settlement in the administrative district of Gmina Bakałarzewo, within Suwałki County, Podlaskie Voivodeship, in north-eastern Poland.

The settlement has a population of 40.

References

Villages in Suwałki County